Dibyendu Nandi is an Indian space scientist known for his studies related to Solar Magnetic Cycle, solar dynamic activity and its influence on Space Weather. He is associated with Montana State University, Center for Astrophysics  Harvard & Smithsonian and IISER Kolkata where he carried most of his research work. He is currently the Head of the Center of Excellence in Space Sciences India (www.cessi.in) which was established by the Ministry of Human Resource Development, Government of India at IISER Kolkata. At CESSI, his research on understanding and predicting the varying space environment of Earth has led to the establishment of India's first operational space weather forecasting lab. 

Dibyendu Nandi was the 2012 recipient of the Karen Harvey Prize of the American Astronomical Society. This is the first time that a space scientist working in the Asia-Pacific region has received this honour.

Education 

Dibyendu did his early schooling at the Cossipore English School and St. James School, both in Kolkata. He then graduated in Physics from St. Xavier's College, Kolkata in 1995 and joined IISc from where he received his M.S. and PhD degrees in 1997 and 2003, respectively.

Employment and positions
  Postdoctoral research fellow, Montana State University, 2002–2004 
  Research scientist, Montana State University, 2005–2007 
  Assistant research professor, Montana State University, 2007–2008 
  Visiting faculty, Institute of Mathematics and Statistics, St Andrews University, 2007 
  Visiting astrophysicist, Center for Astrophysics  Harvard & Smithsonian, 2009, 2010 
  Assistant professor, Indian Institute of Science Education and Research-Kolkata, 2008–continuing
He is the project leader in setting up India's first space weather reading centre in Kolkata, which shall be a centre of excellence specialising in reading space weather conditions.

Awards and recognition

 National scholarship of the Government of India based on the B.S. exams in 1995.
 "Brueckner Studentship" by the Solar Physics Division of the American Astronomical Society in 2000.
 Research work regarding the role of meridional flows in the Sun's interior in setting the period of the sunspot cycle.
 "Martin Forster Gold Medal" for the best thesis of 2002–2003, by the Division of Physical and Mathematical Sciences of the IISc, Bangalore in 2004
 United Kingdom British Council's "Researcher Exchange Programme Award" in 2007.
 American Astronomical Society Solar Physics Division's "Parker Lectureship" at the AAS-SPD Annual Meeting in 2008.
 "Ramanujan Fellowship" by Department of Science and Technology, Government of India in 2009.
 Solar cycle (dynamo) simulation selected as an exhibit for EPO purposes at NASA’s Scientific Visualization Studio and featured in SDO pre-launch outreach videos in 2010
 News-articles and interviews related to research on the unusual lull in solar activity published in multiple media outlets, including Reuters, ABC, CBC, Sydney Morning Herald, Dawn, Times of India, Telegraph, Hindu, Deccan Herald, Hindustan Times, Indian Express etc. Also covered in the following magazines: Scientific American, Sky and Telescope and Discovery. Interviews were aired in: CNN-IBN, Lok Sabha TV, All India Radio (Kolkata) in 2011.
 "Karen Harvey Prize" of the American Astronomical Society's Solar Physics Division in 2012.

After winning his latest award, he said:

References 

1973 births
Living people
Indian astrophysicists
Bengali physicists
Scientists from Kolkata
University of Montana faculty
University of Calcutta alumni
Indian Institute of Science alumni